Tansu Biçer (born 4 July 1978) is a Turkish actor.

Life and career 
Biçer was born on 4 July 1978 in Ankara. He is a graduate of Karşıyaka Şemikler High School in İzmir. He finished his studies at Anadolu University State Conservatory with a degree in theatre studies in 2001. Between 2001–2002, he worked at Theatre Anadolu. In 2002. he moved to Istanbul and helped with founding a theatre institution called Semaver Company. Upon moving to Istanbul, he started appearing in movies and TV series and also worked as a voice actor. For his role in the movie Küf in 2012, Biçer won the Best Supporting Actor award at the 49th Golden Orange Film Festival. In 2020, he had a recurring role in the Netflix original docudrama Rise of Empires: Ottoman.

Filmography

Film 
 Anadolu Leoparı: Emre Kayiş - 2021
 Sardunya: Cağıl Bocut - 2021
 Karakomik Filmler 2: Cem Yılmaz - 2020
 Kırık Kalpler Bankası: Onur Ünlü - 2016
 Neden Tarkovski Olamıyorum: Bahadır - 2015
 Toz Ruhu: Nesimi Yetik - 2014
 İtirazım Var: Onur Ünlü - 2014
 Yozgat Blues: Mahmut Fazıl Coşkun - 2013
 Sen Aydınlatırsın Geceyi: Onur Ünlü - 2013
 F Tipi film: Ezel Akay - 2012 - Gardiyan
 Yük: Erden Kıral - 2012 - 
 Küf: Ali Aydın-Murat Tuncel - 2012, Cemil
 Celal Tan ve Ailesinin Aşırı Acıklı Hikayesi: Onur Ünlü - 2011, Kamuran Tan 
 Jack Hunter and the Star of Heaven: Terry Cunningham - 2009, Rahip
 Kısa'ca Ramazan: Onur Ünlü - 2009
 Beş Şehir: Onur Ünlü - 2009
 Güz Sancısı: Tomris Giritlioğlu - 2009 
 Güneşin Oğlu: Onur Ünlü - 2008
 Süt: Semih Kaplanoğlu - 2008, Postman
 Çocuk: Onur Ünlü - 2007, Hamdi 
 Hacivat Karagöz Neden Öldürüldü?: Ezel Akay - 2005, Misak
 Gönül Yarası: Yavuz Turgul - 2004, Hairdresser

TV series 
 Midnight at the Pera Palace 2022, Ahmet
 Saygı 2020
 Rise of Empires: Ottoman 2020, Orban
 Çukur: - 2019–2020, Yüzüklü/Yücel
 Ölene Kadar: - 2017, Yılmaz Saner
 Analar ve Anneler: - 2015, Tahsin Tuğracı
 Beş Kardeş: Onur Ünlü - 2015
 Cinayet: Serdar Akar - 2014, Kadir
 Şubat: Onur Ünlü - 2012, Saltuk
 Leyla ile Mecnun: Onur Ünlü - 2011, guest appearance
 Muhteşem Yüzyıl: Taylan Biraderler - 2011
 Kapalı Çarşı: Ömür Atay - 2010
 Çok Özel Tim: 2007
 Hırsız Polis: Türkan Derya - 2005, Koray 
 Dişi Kuş: 2004
 Her Şey Yolunda: 2004 - Eser

Awards 
 21st Golden Boll Film Festival, "Best Actor", Toz Ruhu - Nesimi Yetik - 2014
 20th Golden Boll Film Festival, "Best Supporting Actor", Yozgat Blues - Mahmut Fazıl Coşkun - 2013
 49th Golden Orange Film Festival, "Best Supporting Actor", Küf - Ali Aydın - 2012
 16th Sadri Alışık Awards, "Best Supporting Actor", Beş Şehir - Onur Ünlü - 2011
 29th International Istanbul Film Festival, "Best Actor", Beş Şehir - Onur Ünlü - 2010
 46th Golden Orange Film Festival, "Behlül Dal Youth Talent Award", Beş Şehir - Onur Ünlü - 2009

References

External links 

1978 births
Turkish male stage actors
Turkish male film actors
Turkish male television actors
Living people
Male actors from Ankara
21st-century Turkish male actors